Charles Mayer (born 13 February 1970) is an English actor.

Early life
Charles Mayer was born in South Tidworth, Hampshire, England, the son of Jennifer-Ann Wright, a retired RAF Intelligence officer and Martin Mayer, an RAF test pilot. He has one elder and one younger sister, with two nieces and two nephews. He passed the Regular Commissions Board and in 1992 entered Sandhurst, from where he was commissioned into the Welsh Guards. After the Platoon Commander's Battle Course, he took over a platoon in Northern Ireland in January 1993. He spent four years as an officer in Northern Ireland, two years as an instructor at the Infantry Training Centre, Catterick, two years on ceremonial duties in London, and a further two years in Tidworth, working in an office 100 yards from where he was born. After completing ten years of service, Mayer left the army, decided to become an actor, and entered the Guildhall School of Music & Drama in 2002.

Film
In Kojo Productions’ ‘’The Pack’’ dir. Nick Robinson in 2015, and in 2017 Luke Shanahan’s ‘’Rabbit’’.

In writer/director Daniel Hsia's feature film Shanghai Calling (2012) Mayer plays the supporting role of Jensen.

In Mandarin Films' Ip Man 2 (2010), a large budget kung fu film shown in cinemas across Asia, Mayer plays the villain opposite Sammo Hung. He is the corrupt, ruthless 1950s Hong Kong Police officer Chief Superintendent Wallace. His greed and violent temper are finally brought under control when he is arrested at a boxing match.

In Greys Inbetween by Ambient Film Ltd, a romantic tragedy written, directed and produced by Andrew Rajan, Mayer plays the villain, the philandering husband who breaks his girlfriend's heart.

In The Ultimate Truth, a comedy written and directed by Nick Clarke with Wysiwyg Films, he plays a confused meglomaniac gangster turned politician with a sweet moll. It premiered at the Curzon Soho, London in 2003.

Mayer has a major role in a feature Ghosts of Old Shanghai (2011), an independent film written and directed by Eric Heise.

For short film, Mayer played a leading role in Analysis by director Richard Trombly and in Goodbye Shanghai directed by Adam Christian Clark, has written and directed Against All Odds for the Meiwenti Shanghai Short Film Competition 2009, and produced and acted in China White Night for the 2009 Straight8 Film Competition. He has acted in many others.

Television
After drama school Mayer made brief appearances in BBC One's prime time series Spooks and Hotel Babylon, and more recently in Piers Morgan On... Shanghai as the MC at Chinatown. Through 2011 and 2012 he was host of International Channel Shanghai's daily culture programme City Beat. He appears in television series Sam Fox: Extreme Adventures, ANZAC Girls, Deadline Gallipoli, Gallipoli, Wastelander Panda and Pine Gap.

Theatre

In London in 2006 he appeared in the West End in Martin Sherman's Bent, with Alan Cumming. The revival was directed by Daniel Kramer, under whom he has enjoyed several exploratory workshops. In Shanghai he worked with various professional theatre companies, appearing in Yazmena Reza's Art, I Am My Own Wife, No Exit, Oleanna and The Odd Couple. In Australia, Charles has appeared at Adelaide Fringe in I Am My Own Wife and The Last Time I Saw Richard by Cat Commander, at State Theatre Company of South Australia's Othello, The Popular Mechanicals and The 39 Steps, with Bluefruit Theatre in Dennis Kelly's Orphans, at The Old Fitz, Sydney in Anatomy of a Suicide and Pop Up Globe NZ in The Taming of The Shrew and Richard the Third.

References

External links
 Gosney and Kallman's Chinatown website
 
 Charles Mayer on The Spotlight''
 Charles Mayer on CNN Go

1970 births
Living people
People from Tidworth
People educated at Wellington College, Berkshire
English male film actors
English male stage actors
English male television actors
Graduates of the Royal Military Academy Sandhurst